The SFJAZZ Center is an all-ages music venue in the Hayes Valley neighborhood of San Francisco, California, that opened in January 2013. It is considered the "first free-standing building in America built for jazz performance and education." It is home to SFJAZZ, a not-for-profit organization that both presents and facilitates jazz education in the San Francisco Bay Area. SFJAZZ has, since 1983, produced the San Francisco Jazz Festival, and since 2004, the SFJAZZ Collective. The SFJAZZ season, in addition to the SFJAZZ-produced San Francisco Jazz Festival and Summer Sessions, includes over 400 performances annually in the San Francisco Bay Area.

The building was designed by Mark Cavagnero Associates, and cost $64 million to complete. The performance space is the Robert N. Miner Auditorium, with a sound system by Meyer Sound Laboratories. The Center features murals by Sandow Birk and Elyse Pignolet.

References

External links

SFJAZZ website

Music venues in San Francisco
Jazz clubs in the San Francisco Bay Area
Jazz organizations
Non-profit organizations based in San Francisco
Arts organizations based in the San Francisco Bay Area
Arts organizations established in 2013
2013 establishments in California
2013 in San Francisco